Haikouella is an agnathan chordate from the Lower Cambrian Maotianshan Shales of Chengjiang County in Yunnan Province, China. An analysis in 2015 placed Haikouella as a junior synonym of Yunnanozoon, another Maotianshan shale Cambrian chordate.

It is similar to the form Yunnanozoon, which is possibly a hemichordate. Still, there are anatomical differences from Yunnanozoon, including a larger stomach and smaller (0.1 mm) pharyngeal teeth. Haikouella does not have bones or a movable jaw, but it otherwise resembles vertebrates. Haikouichthys and Myllokunmingia, which seem to share significant fish-like characters, have been found in the same beds. Suspected hemichordates are also known from these deposits as well as from the Middle Cambrian Burgess Shale of British Columbia. Other than possible fish scales/plates from the Upper Cambrian of Wyoming, these Chinese fish-like chordates are one of the only known pre-Ordovician craniates.

Haikouella is known from 305 specimens mostly from a single bed in the Maotianshan Shales. The animal is 20 to 30 mm (40 mm max) in length and has a head, gills, brain, notochord, well developed musculature, heart and circulatory system. It has a bent caudal projection of the notochord that might be a primitive tail fin. It might have a pair of lateral eyes. Very small (0.1 mm) structures that are probably pharyngeal teeth are present in the body cavity. A few specimens display dorsal and ventral fins.

There are two known species, H. lanceolata and the type species, and H. jianshanensis.

References

External links
Another description and large Haikouella mass mortality image

Chordates
Cambrian chordates
Maotianshan shales fossils
Enigmatic deuterostome taxa
Prehistoric chordate genera

Cambrian genus extinctions